Jondal is a village in Ullensvang Municipality in Vestland county, Norway. It was the administrative centre of the former Jondal municipality prior to its dissolution in 2020.

There is a regular ferry route from Jondal to Tørvikbygd in Kvam municipality, across the fjord.

The village is bisected by the Jondalselvi river. The village is the commercial centre of the northwestern part of the municipality.  There is one school, Jondal School, and it is located on the north side of the river in Jondal. Jondal Church is also located here.

References

Villages in Vestland
Ullensvang